Harold Day (22 May 1890 – 8 June 1961) was an Australian rules footballer who played with Essendon in the Victorian Football League (VFL).

Notes

External links 
		

1890 births
1961 deaths
Australian rules footballers from Victoria (Australia)
Essendon Football Club players